Guðlaugur Þór Þórðarson (born 19 December 1967) is an Icelandic politician who has been serving as Minister for the Environment, Energy and Climate since 28 November 2021.

Early life and education
Guðlaugur Þór Þórðarson graduated with a BA degree in Political Sciences from the University of Iceland in 1996.

Political career
Guðlaugur started his involvement in the Independence party in 1987 when he was elected on the board of the National Youth Organisation of the Independence Party in which he served until 1997 of which he was vice chairman 1989–1993 and chairman 1993–1997. He was then elected on the Reykjavík City Council in 1998 and sat two four-year terms there. He sat on the parliamentary committee on welfare issues 2003–2006, the committee on fisheries 2003–2007, and the committee on the environment 2003–2007 (chairman 2004–2007).

He has been a member of the Althing (Iceland's parliament) for the Independence Party since 2003 and served as the Minister of Health from 24 May 2007 to 1 February 2009.

Guðlaugur represented Reykjavík North 2003–2009, then switched to Reykjavík South for the 2009 elections before returning to Reykjavík North in 2013, where he has topped the party list for the last three elections. In the party primary in 2006 he defeated then Minister of Justice and Ecclesiastical Affairs Björn Bjarnason for the top spot in Reykjavík North.

He has served as Minister for Foreign Affairs since 11 January 2017. 

Guðlaugur opposes Icelandic membership of the European Union. He is strongly supportive of Iceland's membership of the European Economic Area, describing the benefits as substantial.

Personal life
He is married and has four children.

See also
List of foreign ministers in 2017

References

External links
 Official biography
 Official website

|-

|-

1967 births
Gudlaugur Thor Thordarson
Gudlaugur Thor Thordarson
Gudlaugur Thor Thordarson
Living people
Gudlaugur Thor Thordarson
Gudlaugur Thor Thordarson
Gudlaugur Thor Thordarson